The Pannonian island mountains is a term for isolated mountains scattered across the Pannonian Plain, chiefly its western and southern parts, in Hungary, Serbia and Croatia. In prehistoric times, these mountains were islands of the ancient Pannonian Sea that disappeared about 600,000 years ago.  

The island mountains include:
Croatia
Central Slavonian Mountains:
Dilj 
Krndija
Papuk
Psunj
Požeška Gora
Medvednica in western Croatia

Hungary
Transdanubian Mountains of western Hungary:
Bakony
Buda Hills
Gerecse
Pilis Mountains
Vértes Hills
Velence Mountains
Mecsek, in south Hungary
Kőszeg Mountains (Geschriebenstein), on Hungary–Austria border
Baranya Hills

Serbia (autonomous province of Vojvodina)
Fruška Gora 
Vršac Mountains

See also
 Danubian Hills of Slovakia

References

 
Mountain ranges of Serbia
Geography of Vojvodina
Geography of Croatia
Geography of Hungary